The  is an 87.8-kilometer long railway line operated mainly by the Hokkaido Railway Company (JR Hokkaido). The line connects Naka-Oguni Station in Sotogahama, Aomori, through the Seikan Tunnel between Honshu and Hokkaido, to Kikonai Station in Kikonai, Hokkaido. Two stations on the Tsugaru-Kaikyō Line, Tappi-Kaitei Station and Yoshioka-Kaitei Station (both closed since 2014), were inside the tunnel.

Facilities 
The approximately 82 km section of concrete-slab track-bed was built to accommodate the Hokkaido Shinkansen, and is dual gauge, with both narrow (national standard) 1,067 mm gauge and 1,435 mm gauge track. As all regular passenger services are Shinkansen, the Kaikyō Line is normally used only by freight trains.

The line was originally electrified at 20 kV AC (50 Hz) and was changed in 2016 to the Shinkansen-standard 25 kV AC (50 Hz). To comply with freight operations, JR Freight introduced Class EH800 dual-voltage locomotives.

Stations
Naka-Oguni Station
Okutsugaru-Imabetsu Station (Shinkansen station with facilities for freight trains on the Kaikyō Line)
Tappi-Kaitei Station (closed 2014)
Yoshioka-Kaitei Station (closed 2014)
Shiriuchi Station (closed 2014)
Kikonai Station

History
The line was opened on 13 March 1988 in conjunction with the opening of the Seikan Tunnel. Originally the line ran both freight and passenger trains; the latter included daytime limited express Hakuchō and night train Hokutosei.

Three of the stations on the Kaikyō Line, Tappi-Kaitei, Yoshioka-Kaitei, and Shiriuchi, were closed on 15 March 2014 due to construction work connected with the Hokkaido Shinkansen, which opened on 26 March 2016. From that time, all passenger services through the line were discontinued.

See also
Seikan Tunnel Tappi Shako Line

References
This article incorporates material from the corresponding article in the Japanese Wikipedia

Lines of Hokkaido Railway Company
Tsugaru-Kaikyō Line
1067 mm gauge railways in Japan
Seikan Tunnel